Konrad Domoń (born 5 August 1986) is a Polish footballer who plays as a defender for Orzeł Przeworsk.

Career

Domoń started his career with Polish fifth division side Resovia, where he received trial offers from GKS Bełchatów and Lech Poznań in the Polish top flight, helping them earn promotion to the Polish second division within 16 seasons.

References

External links
 
 

People from Rzeszów
Polish footballers
1986 births
Association football defenders
Living people
Resovia (football) players
III liga players
IV liga players
I liga players
II liga players